Ahmad al-Shukeiri (also transliterated al-Shuqayri, Shuqairi, Shuqeiri, Shukeiry; 1 January 1908 – 26 February 1980) was the first Chairman of the Palestinian Liberation Organization, serving from 1964–1967.

Early life 
Shukeiri was born in Tebnine, south Lebanon then Ottoman Empire to a Turkish mother and a Palestinian father, As'ad Shukeiri (1860–1940) (who was elected to the Ottoman Parliament in 1908 and 1912). Ahmad acquired the Turkish language from his mother. After studying law in the British law college in Jerusalem, he became a prominent lawyer in British-Palestine and a member of the Independence Party. In 1945 he went to Washington, D.C. to establish a Palestinian office and in 1946 joined the Arab Higher Committee.

Political career 
Shukeiri was a member of the Syrian delegation to the United Nations from 1949 to 1951. He then became assistant Secretary General for the Arab League from 1950–1956, Saudi ambassador to the United Nations from 1957 to 1962. At the 1964 Arab League summit (Cairo), he was given a mandate to initiate contacts aimed at establishing a Palestinian entity.

In December 1962, representing Saudi Arabia, he told the Special Political Committee of the United Nations General Assembly that the Tacuara movement had been formed to combat Zionism and he hoped it would spread in Latin America and its principles adopted by the United Nations. After receiving information about Tacuara from the Argentinian and Chilean delegations, he backed down, acknowledging that Tacuara was a fascist movement and claiming instead that it was more appropriate to compare Tacuara to Israel.

Chairman of the PLO 

In May 1964, he was elected the first Chairman of the PLO (Palestine Liberation Organization) with the support of Egyptian leader Gamal Abdel Nasser. He resigned in December 1967 in the aftermath of the Six-Day War in June. His enemies and opponents used him as a scapegoat. 
From 28 May to 2 June 1964 Shukeiri and 396 nominated representatives from Jordan, Syria, Lebanon, the Gaza strip, Egypt, Qatar, Kuwait, Libya and Iraq attended a Palestinian Conference (The First Palestinian National Council in East Jerusalem). Delegates wore badges carrying a map of Palestine and inscribed "We shall return". The Times reported that following an introductory address by King Hussein of Jordan, Shukeiri told delegates that "Palestinians had experienced 16 years' misery and it was time they relied on themselves and liberated Palestine from the Israelis". The conference announced the establishment of the PLO as the representative of the Palestinian Arabs. Shukeiri and his colleagues also announced the formation of the Palestinian National Fund, and at the Second Arab Summit Conference in Alexandria in  September 1964 of a military wing, the Palestine Liberation Army. 

Prior to the Six Day War, Shukeiri was reported to have threatened to "throw the Jews into the sea" and, when asked about Israel-born Jews, he said that "Whoever survives will stay in Filastin, but in my opinion no one will remain alive". These statements gained little attention at the time but after the war they were used as part of the Israeli government's justification of their initiation of the war. Shukeiri consistently denied having made such a statement; his denial was not printed in most Western press, but was reported on French radio in September 1967:
I stated exactly the opposite. I was in Amman two days before the Israeli aggression and was asked at a press conference if we would throw the Jews into the sea if the Arabs won the war. I immediately answered this question and said that we have no desire to throw the Jews into the sea nor do we want to annihilate the Jews. But Jewish sources twisted these statements around, and as you know Zionism is expert at lying and distorting things.

Moshe Shemesh writes that he probably meant to send the European Jews by sea to Europe while his second statement had a genocidal meaning 

Shukeiri was succeeded as Chairman of PLO by Yahya Hammuda in December 1967.

Later life 

Between 1968 and 1979, Shukeiri wrote more than twenty books dealing with the Palestinian cause and the Arab Unity. He died on 26 February 1980, aged 72 in Amman.

Notes

References

'Arab Move To Free Palestine: "16 Years Of Misery"', From Our Correspondent, The Times, Saturday, 30 May 1964; p. 7; Issue 56025; col D.
Connell, Dan (2001). Rethinking Revolution: New Strategies for Democracy & Social Justice. The Red Sea Press. 
'Mr Ahmed Shukeiri', Obituary, The Times, Wednesday, 27 February 1980; p. 16; Issue 60561; col H.
Arieh Avneri, The Claim of Dispossession: Jewish Land-Settlement and the Arabs 1878–1948 (London: Transaction Books, 2002) p. 233.
Encyclopaedia Palaestina, Micropaedia, 1st volume, pp. 98–100.

External links

Biography of Ahmad Al-Shukairy 

1908 births
1980 deaths
People from Bint Jbeil District
Palestinian people of Turkish descent
20th-century Palestinian lawyers
Lebanese emigrants to Mandatory Palestine
Palestinian politicians
Palestine Liberation Organization members
Permanent Representatives of Saudi Arabia to the United Nations
Palestinian refugees
Palestinian Arab nationalists
Members of the Executive Committee of the Palestine Liberation Organization